The 2015 NCHC Tournament was the second tournament in league history. It was played between March 13 and March 21, 2015. Quarterfinal games were played at home team campus sites, while the final four games were played at the Target Center in Minneapolis, Minnesota. By winning the tournament, Miami received the NCHC's automatic bid to the 2015 NCAA Division I Men's Ice Hockey Tournament.

Format
The first round of the postseason tournament features a best-of-three games format. All eight conference teams participate in the tournament. Teams are seeded No. 1 through No. 8 according to their final conference standing, with a tiebreaker system used to seed teams with an identical number of points accumulated. The top four seeded teams each earn home ice and host one of the lower seeded teams.

The winners of the first round series advance to the Target Center for the NCHC Frozen Faceoff. The Frozen Faceoff uses a single-elimination format. Teams are re-seeded No. 1 through No. 4 according to the final regular season conference standings.

Conference standings
Note: GP = Games played; W = Wins; L = Losses; T = Ties; PTS = Points; GF = Goals For; GA = Goals Against

Bracket
Teams are reseeded after the first round

* denotes overtime periods

Results

Quarterfinals
All times are local.

(1) North Dakota vs. (8) Colorado College

(2) Miami vs. (7) Western Michigan

(3) Omaha vs. (6) St. Cloud State

(4) Denver vs. (5) Minnesota-Duluth

Semifinals

(1) North Dakota vs. (6) St. Cloud State

(2) Miami vs. (4) Denver

Third Place

(1) North Dakota vs. (4) Denver

Championship

(2) Miami vs. (6) St. Cloud State

Tournament awards

Frozen Faceoff All-Tournament Team
F Blake Coleman* (Miami)
F Austin Czarnik (Miami)
F Joey Benik (St. Cloud State)
D Louie Belpedio (Miami)
D Tim Daly (St. Cloud State)
G Charlie Lindgren (St. Cloud State)
* Most Valuable Player(s)

References

NCHC Men's Ice Hockey Tournament
National Collegiate Hockey Conference Tournament
Ice hockey in Minnesota
College sports in Minnesota
NCHC Men's Ice Hockey Tournament